The 69th Troop Carrier Squadron is an inactive United States Air Force unit.  It was last active with the 916th Troop Carrier Group, based at Carswell Air Force Base, Texas.  It was inactivated on 25 November 1965.

History

World War II
Established under I Troop Carrier Command, January 1943.  After training deployed to Fifth Air Force in the Southwest Pacific Theater, August 1943 during the New Guinea Campaign.   Engaged in combat operations, flying combat cargo resupply missions,  troop carrier missions, parachute drops and other missions as necessary in New Guinea, Dutch East Indies; Philippine Campaign and the Battle of Okinawa.   Participated in the Occupation of Japan, 1945-1946.

Air Force Reserve
Reactivated in the Air Force Reserve 1947, activated at Cleveland Airport, Ohio.  Not equipped or manned until 1950 when moved to Greenville AFB, South Carolina when equipped with C-119 Flying Boxcars.  Activated during Korean War.

Reactivated in the reserves, 1956, equipped with C-119s.  Inactivated 1965

Lineage
 Constituted as the 69th Troop Carrier Squadron on 22 January 1943
 Activated on 9 February 1943
 Inactivated on 15 January 1946
 Activated in the reserve on 3 August 1947
 Redesignated 69th Troop Carrier Squadron, Medium on 27 June 1949
 Ordered to active service on 15 October 1950
 Inactivated on 14 July 1952
 Activated in the reserve on 25 March 1956
 Inactivated on 25 November 1965

Assignments
 433d Troop Carrier Group, 9 February 1943 – 15 January 1946
 433d Troop Carrier Group, 3 August 1947 – 14 July 1952
 433d Troop Carrier Group, 25 March 1956
 433d Troop Carrier Wing, 14 April 1959
 923d Troop Carrier Group, 17 January 1963 - 25 November 1965

Stations

 Florence Army Air Field, South Carolina, 9 February 1943
 Sedalia Army Air Field, Missouri, 19 March 1943
 Laurinburg-Maxton Army Air Base, North Carolina, 6 June 1943
 Baer Field, Indiana, 1 – 12 August 1943
 Jackson Airfield (7 Mile Drome), Port Moresby, New Guinea, 27 August 1943
 Nadzab Airfield Complex, New Guinea, 5 November 1943
 Hollandia Airfield Complex, Netherlands East Indies, c. 10 July 1944
 Mokmer Airfield, Biak Island, Netherlands East Indies, c. 20 October 1944
 Tanauan Airfield, Leyte, Philippines, 18 January 1945

 Clark Field, Luzon, Philippines, c. 1 June 1945
 North Field (Iwo Jima), C. 27 August 1945
 Ie Shima Airfield, Okinawa, 9 September 1945
 Tachikawa Airfield, Japan, c. 25 September 1945 – 15 January 1946
 Cleveland Municipal Airport, Ohio, 13 April 1947
 Greenville Air Force Base, South Carolina, 18 October 1950 – 20 July 1951
 Rhein-Main Air Base, West Germany, 6 Aug 1951 - 14 Jul 1952
 Tinker Air Force Base, Oklahoma, 25 March 1956
 Hensley Field, Texas, 16 November 1957
 Carswell Air Force Base, Texas, 3 March 1963 - 25 November 1965

Aircraft
 Douglas C-47 Skytrain, 1943-1945
 Boeing B-17 Flying Fortress, 1944  (used as transport)
 Curtiss C-46 Commando, 1944
 Fairchild C-119 Flying Boxcar, 1950-1952; 1956-1965

References 

 Notes

Bibliography

 
 
 

Military units and formations established in 1943
069
069